Eric Rede Buckley (31 August 1868 – 6 March 1948) was  Archdeacon of Sudbury from 1930 until 1932.

Buckley was educated at  Merchant Taylors' School, Northwood and  St John's College, Oxford; and  ordained in 1892. His first post  was a  curacy at  Bodmin. After this he was Vicar of Kirtlington (1895–1902) then Burley in Wharfedale (1902–21). He was Chaplain to the Bishop of Bradford until his Archdeacon’s appointment.

References

1868 births
1948 deaths
People educated at Merchant Taylors' School, Northwood
Alumni of St John's College, Oxford
Archdeacons of Ipswich
Archdeacons of Sudbury